Tom Allen (5 September 1912 – 18 March 1954) was an Australian cricketer. He played in 43 first-class matches for Queensland between 1933 and 1941.

Biography
Allen was from the rural town of Greenmount near Toowoomba and he attended Toowoomba Grammar School. He played cricket for Toowoomba, ultimately captaining the Toowoomba XI, and was described as possibly the best opening batsman ever produced by Toowoomba in 1933. In 1933 he was selected for the Queensland State side, and the following year he was named State vice-captain. He briefly captained the State team in 1936 and scored a century against the touring English side during the 1936/37 Ashes, and later served as a Queensland State selector.

In his career Allen was a farmer in Cambooya and he died there in 1954. In his personal life he married Noel Vaughan in 1937, and they had three children. His son Ross Allen also played First-class cricket for Queensland.

See also
 List of Queensland first-class cricketers

References

External links
 

1912 births
1954 deaths
Australian cricketers
Queensland cricketers
Cricketers from Toowoomba